Jon delos Reyes is a Guamanian professional mixed martial artist currently competing in the Flyweight division of the Ultimate Fighting Championship.

Background
Reyes was born and raised in Guam, and both of his parents are Filipino. Reyes began training in the martial arts in high school with Brazilian jiu-jitsu before transitioning into kickboxing and mixed martial arts. Reyes is the former Grappler's Quest Champion, NAGA Champion, Pan Asia Brazilian Jiu-Jitsu Champion, Pan Asia No-Gi Grappling Champion, Marianas Open Brazilian Jiu-Jitsu Champion, Guam Kickboxing Invitational Champion, and an IBJJF-Las Vegas Open Medalist.

Mixed martial arts career

Early career
Reyes made his professional MMA debut in 2008 and compiled an overall record of 7-2 before being signed by the Ultimate Fighting Championship. Reyes had originally tried out for The Ultimate Fighter 18 and didn't make the cut but demonstrated enough talent to earn a call from the promotion a year later.

Ultimate Fighting Championship
Reyes made his promotional debut against Dustin Kimura On January 4, 2014 at UFC Fight Night 34. Reyes lost via armbar submission in the first round.

Reyes was next scheduled to face Richie Vaculik at UFC Fight Night 43 on June 28, 2014. However, Reyes was forced from the bout with an injury and replaced by promotional newcomer Roldan Sangcha-an.

Reyes then dropped down to the Flyweight division and faced Kyoji Horiguchi at UFC Fight Night 52 on September 20, 2014. Reyes was defeated via first-round TKO.

Reyes faced Roldan Sangcha-an on May 16, 2015 at UFC Fight Night 66. He won the fight by submission in the second round.  The win also earned Reyes his first Fight of the Night bonus award.

Reyes faced Neil Seery on October 24, 2015 at UFC Fight Night 76. He lost the bout via submission in the second round.

Championships and accomplishments
Ultimate Fighting Championship
Fight of the Night (One time)

Mixed martial arts record

 
|-
|Loss
|align=center|8–5
|Neil Seery
|Submission (guillotine choke)
|UFC Fight Night: Holohan vs. Smolka
|
|align=center|2
|align=center|4:12
|Dublin, Ireland
| 
|-
|Win
|align=center| 8–4
|Roldan Sangcha-an
| Submission (rear-naked choke)
|UFC Fight Night: Edgar vs. Faber
|
|align=center| 2
|align=center| 3:13
|Pasay, Philippines
|
|-
|Loss
|align=center|7–4
|Kyoji Horiguchi
|TKO (punches)
|UFC Fight Night: Hunt vs. Nelson
|
|align=center|1
|align=center|3:48
|Saitama, Japan
|
|-
|Loss
|align=center|7–3
|Dustin Kimura
|Submission (armbar)
|UFC Fight Night: Saffiedine vs. Lim
|
|align=center|1
|align=center|2:13
|Marina Bay, Singapore
|
|-
|Win
|align=center|7–2
|Troy Bantiag
|Submission (armbar)
|PXC 33
|
|align=center|1
|align=center|3:46
|Pasig, Philippines
|
|-
|Win
|align=center|6–2
|Josh Duenas
|TKO (doctor stoppage)
|Rites of Passage 12
|
|align=center|2
|align=center|5:00
|Saipan, Northern Mariana Islands
|
|-
|Win
|align=center|5–2
|Virgil Ortega
|TKO (punches)
|PXC 28
|
|align=center|1
|align=center|N/A
|Pasig, Philippines
| 
|-
|Win
|align=center|4–2
|Derek Rangamar
|Submission (rear-naked choke)
|Trench Warz 12
|
|align=center|1
|align=center|2:30
|Saipan, Northern Mariana Islands
| 
|-
|Loss
|align=center|3–2
|Russell Doane
|Submission (rear-naked choke)
|808 Battlegrounds: Dropping Jaws
|
|align=center|1
|align=center|1:48
|Waipahu, Hawaii, United States
|
|-
|Win
|align=center|3–1
|Chris Laayug
|TKO (punches)
|Trench Warz 10
|
|align=center|1
|align=center|1:17
|Saipan, Northern Mariana Islands
|
|-
|Loss
|align=center|2–1
|Kyle Aguon
|Decision (unanimous)
|PXC 15
|
|align=center|3
|align=center|5:00
|Pasig, Philippines
|
|-
|Win
|align=center|2–0
|Brandon Chandler
|Submission (rear-naked choke)
|PXC 14
|
|align=center|1
|align=center|N/A
|Pasig, Philippines
|
|-
|Win
|align=center|1–0
|Conrad Iba
|Submission (slam)
|Rites of Passage 4
|
|align=center|1
|align=center|2:04
|Saipan, Northern Mariana Islands
|
|}

See also
 List of current UFC fighters
 List of male mixed martial artists

References

External links

1989 births
Living people
Bantamweight mixed martial artists
Flyweight mixed martial artists
Guamanian male mixed martial artists
American mixed martial artists of Filipino descent
American sanshou practitioners
American practitioners of Brazilian jiu-jitsu
People from Tamuning, Guam
Guamanian people of Filipino descent
Ultimate Fighting Championship male fighters
Mixed martial artists utilizing sanshou
Mixed martial artists utilizing Brazilian jiu-jitsu